Shilpa Shinde (born 28 August 1977) is an Indian television actress. She is known for playing Angoori Tiwari in &tv's Bhabhi Ji Ghar Par Hai!. In 2017, she participated in Bigg Boss 11 and emerged as the winner.

Early life 
Shinde was born on 28 August 1977 into a Maharashtrian family. Her father, Dr. Satyadeo Shinde, was the judge of a High Court while her mother Geeta Satyadeo Shinde is a homemaker. She has two elder sisters and a younger brother. Shinde was a psychology student, but failed to obtain her bachelor's degree. Her father wanted her to study law, but she was not interested in studying the subject.

Personal life
Shinde met actor Romit Raj on the set of TV show Maayka (2007–2009). The two started dating each other soon afterwards. They got engaged in 2009 however both called it off later.

Shinde went into depression when her father died in 2013 of Alzheimer’s disease. Her father did not want her to take up acting as a profession. Shinde said, "He never wanted me to get into acting but when I insisted he did give me a year’s time and I became an actress. I was there with him day and night in the last couple of months and now he is gone."

Career
Shinde made her television debut in 1999. She came into the spotlight for her role in the serial Bhabhi. She next starred in the serial Kabhi Aaye Na Judaai and later played the role of Chitra in Sanjeevani. In 2002 in the same year she played the lead role in Amrapali. Later, she continued to play another role in the show Miss India. In January 2004, Shinde played the parallel lead as Meher in DD National's show Meher – Kahani Haq Aur Haqeeqat Ki. 

In 2005, Shilpa played a role in Zee TV's Rabba Ishq Na Hove as Juhi until 2006. She then was seen in Betiyaan Apni Yaa Paraaya Dhan as Veera, Hari Mirchi Lal Mirchi, and Waaris as Gayatri.

Shinde has acted in two Telugu films-Dasari Narayana Rao's Chhina and Suresh Verma's Shivani.

Shinde's breakthrough role was Koyal Narayan in SAB TV's sitcom Chidiya Ghar opposite Paresh Ganatra. Shinde quit the show in 2014 due to problems in her personal life and was replaced by Shubhangi Atre, who played the part for a year.

In 2015, Shinde played the lead role in &TV's Bhabi Ji Ghar Par Hai!. Shinde became a household name with her portrayal of Angoori Bhabhi in Bhabi Ji Ghar Par Hai!, but she quit in March 2016 after having several issues with the makers and accusing them of mentally torturing her. Shinde was replaced by Shubhangi Atre. Atre cited this fact as a mere coincidence.

In 2017, Shinde participated  in the reality show Bigg Boss 11. Shinde emerged as the winner in January 2018.

In 2020, she appeared on Gangs of Filmistan and later quit. In December 2020, Shinde portrayed the role of Queen Meerawati in the web series Paurashpur.

In 2022, Shinde participated in Jhalak Dikhhla Jaa 10. She was eliminated in Week 7, finishing at 12th place.

In 2023 she played a cameo role of a lady cop ACP Naina Mathur in Sony SAB's Maddam Sir.

Other works

On 5 February 2019, Shinde joined the Indian National Congress ahead of the 2019 Lok Sabha election.

Filmography

Films

Television

Web series

See also
 List of Hindi television actresses

References

External links

 
 

Living people
Indian television actresses
Marathi people
1977 births
Bigg Boss (Hindi TV series) contestants
Indian women in politics
Big Brother (franchise) winners
Indian actor-politicians